A bed skirt, sometimes spelled bedskirt, a bed ruffle, a dust ruffle in North America, a valance, or a valance sheet in the British Isles, is a piece of decorative fabric that is placed between the mattress and the box spring of a bed. The purpose of a bed skirt is to give a stylish appearance to a bed without exposing the sides of the box spring or any space under the bed that may be used for storage. Additionally, decorative bed boots may be used to cover legs and enhance decor when bed skirts do not reach the floor.

Historical use
Historically, bed skirts were used to block drafts, which could chill the undersides of beds as well as to prevent dust from accumulating under the bed.

References

Bedding